The four De Zeven Provinciën-class frigates are air-defence and command frigates in service with the Royal Netherlands Navy (Koninklijke Marine). This class of ships is also known as "LCF" (Luchtverdedigings- en commandofregat, air defense and command frigate). The ships are similar to the German s in role and mission.

Antiaircraft warfare
These ships were optimized for anti-aircraft warfare and command. For this role the ships are equipped with an advanced sensor and weapons suite. The primary sensors for this role are the long range surveillance radar SMART-L and the multifunction radar Active Phased Array Radar (APAR). The SMART-L and APAR are highly complementary, in the sense that SMART-L is a D band radar providing very long range surveillance while APAR is an I band radar providing precise target tracking, a highly capable horizon search capability, and missile guidance using the Interrupted Continuous Wave Illumination (ICWI) technique, thus allowing guidance of 32 semi-active radar homing missiles in flight simultaneously, including 16 in the terminal guidance phase. The primary anti-aircraft weapons are the point defence Evolved Sea Sparrow Missile and the area defence RIM-66 Standard Missile (SM-2) Block IIIA. The Mk 41 Vertical Launching System is used to house and launch these missiles. 32 Evolved Sea Sparrow Missile and 32 Standard Missile SM-2 Block IIIA are carried.

Ballistic missile defence
The Royal Netherlands Navy (RNN) investigated the use of these ships for the role of ballistic missile defence (BMD). A study by the RNN, the Netherlands Defence Material Organization, Thales Nederland, Raytheon Missile Systems, Johns Hopkins University Applied Physics Laboratory, and Lockheed Martin was conducted to establish the feasibility of modifying the De Zeven Provinciën class to provide it the capability to intercept ballistic missiles. In particular, the study examined the feasibility of integrating the SM-3 Block IB missile with the SMART-L and APAR radars. The study concluded that – with certain modifications to the SMART-L and APAR, as well as to the ship's Combat Management System and the missile itself – BMD with the De Zeven Provinciën class could be achieved. During a 2015 very large NATO military exercise the BMD capabilities were proven, the sensor suite discovered ballistic targets, and the ship destroyed them using both its own surface-to-air missiles, as well as using a U.S. Navy destroyer's missiles, by providing target data and missile guidance.

A contract was awarded for the radar modification in June 2012. Operational tests and live firing showed the performance to exceed expectations.

Modernization

In late 2011, the Ministry of Defence announced a modernization program to upgrade the SMART-L early-warning radar so that  De Zeven Provinciën-class frigates can detect and track ballistic missiles at extended range. In 2018 plans were announced to acquire the BMD-capable SM-3 surface-to-air missiles as the ships are provisioned for an extra 8-cell vertical launch module, De Zeven Provinciën-class frigates can pass on the tracking and detection data to other sea-based or land-defense BMD assets, including U.S. Navy's warships, that can deal with a ballistic missile threat. This modernization program is scheduled for completion by late 2017 for the entire De Zeven Provinciën class.

On 3 May 2018 the Dutch Secretary of Defence, Barbara Visser, informed the Dutch national parliament that the evolved sea sparrow missile (ESSM) aboard the De Zeven Provinciën-class frigates will be upgraded from block 1 to block 2. This upgrade will be completed by 2024 and will allow the frigates to deal with the growing threat of modern anti-ship missiles. ESSM Block 2 allows the four frigates to defend against missiles that have greater speed, agility and perform unexpected movements. The current Harpoon surface-to-surface missile (SSM) will also be replaced with a new SSM by 2024. Furthermore, the current Otobreda 127/54 Compact cannon will be replaced with Otobreda 127/64 cannons. The new cannon must be able to fire multiple types of ammunition, including in the future precision-guided ammunition. The project costs between €100 million and €250 million, and will be take place between 2018 and 2023. Lastly, the Goalkeepers will be upgraded to a new version and all ships will have two installed as originally designed, they will eventually be replaced after 2025 by a new system.

In the Strategic Defence Review 2022 the acquisition of SM-3 missile and BGM-109 Tomahawk was announced for which the Mk 41 vertical launch systems will be expanded with an additional unit of 8 cells.

Surface and subsurface warfare
As noted above, these ships were optimized for anti-aircraft warfare, but they also have weapons on-board capable of attacking surface and submarine targets, for example: the RGM-84F Harpoon missile and Mk 46 torpedoes. In a new defense Study published by the Dutch government in March 2018, it was stated the frigates will receive a new surface-to-surface missile to succeed the Harpoon Block 1D.

Proposals to equip the De Zeven Provinciën-class frigates with a total of 32 BGM-109 Tomahawk (8 per ship) cruise missiles were evaluated, but these were shelved in May 2005 but reconfirmed in 2022.

Live missile firings
The firings involved the firing of a single ESSM and a single SM-2ER Block IIIA. These firings were the first ever live firings involving a full-size ship-borne active electronically scanned array (i.e., APAR) guiding missiles using the ICWI technique in an operational environment. As related by Jane's Navy International:

During the tracking and missile-firing tests, target profiles were provided by Greek-built EADS/3Sigma Iris PVK medium-range subsonic target drones. [...] According to the RNLN, ... APAR immediately acquired the missile and maintained track until destruction". [...] These ground-breaking tests represented the world's first live verification of the ICWI technique.

The tests involved three live-firing events including firing a single SM-2 Block IIIA at an Iris target drone at long range, a single ESSM at an Iris target drone, and a two-salvo launch (with one salvo comprising two SM-2 Block IIIAs and the other comprising two ESSMs) against two incoming Iris target drones.

Counterpiracy operations
Ships of the De Zeven Provinciën class have been involved in counter-piracy operations off the Horn of Africa. The untraditional target set (i.e., small slow-moving or even static surface targets) can apparently be challenging for doppler radars designed to take on "high end" threats. However, according to Jane's International Defence Review:

[The RNLN has] reported great success using tailored surface-search software for the APAR sets fitted to the De Zeven Provinciën-class frigates deployed on antipiracy roles. By sacrificing some of APAR's high-end antiaircraft warfare capabilities, which were deemed unnecessary for the antipiracy role, its performance and resolution were improved in the surface-search role.

Export 
On 30 November 2017, Alion Canada submitted a proposal based on the De Zeven Provinciën class for the Canadian Single Class Surface Combatant Project. Damen Group, as builder of the De Zeven Provincien-class frigates, was part of Alion's team in this proposal.

Replacement 

In 2020 it was announced that these intensively used ships will not be replaced as planned around 2025. The Royal Netherlands Navy and the German Navy will cooperate towards a joint platform design to replace both the s and De Zeven Provinciën-class frigates from 2030–2035 onwards.

List of ships

All ships were built at the Damen Schelde Naval Shipbuilding shipyard in Vlissingen, Netherlands.

Similar ships

 , French/Italian collaboration
 , Denmark
 , India

See also
 List of naval ship classes in service

Footnotes

External links

 De Zeven Provinciën-class Air-defence and Command Frigate (LCF) – Royal Netherlands Navy website of the Netherlands Ministry of Defence
 De Zeven Provincien Class Air Defence and Command Frigate @ naval-technology.com
 Netherlands – De Zeven Provincien Class Destroyer @ AMI International
 De Zeven Provinciën class (Private page)

Frigate classes
 
Stealth ships